Choapam (also Choápam or Choapan) may refer to:

Choapam District, Oaxaca
Santiago Choapam, Oaxaca
Choápam Zapotec language